The following elections occurred in the year 1821.

North America

United States
 United States House of Representatives elections in New York, 1821
 United States Senate election in New York, 1821

See also
 :Category:1821 elections

1821
Elections